The Swift River (Jamaica) is a river of Jamaica. The river had massive floods during the 1930s {1932-1940}, which nearly brought the only major settlement, which shares the same name, to extinction.

See also
List of rivers of Jamaica

References
 GEOnet Names Server
OMC Map
CIA Map
Ford, Jos C. and Finlay, A.A.C. (1908).The Handbook of Jamaica. Jamaica Government Printing Office

Rivers of Jamaica